Cynegeticus, Cynegetica or Cynegeticon (Gr. Κυνεγετικά) is the title of several works about hunting, particularly with dogs, from antiquity:
Cynegetica by Marcus Aurelius Olympius Nemesianus (283/284 CE)
Cynegeticon Liber by Gratius Faliscus, from the Augustean period (63 BCE – 14 CE)
Cynegeticus by Oppian of Apamea, dated after 211 CE
Cynegeticus by Oppian of Anazarbus, from the 2nd century CE (during the reign of the emperors Marcus Aurelius and Commodus)
Cynegeticus by Arrian (c. 86 – 160 CE)
Cynegeticus by Xenophon (c. 430 – 354 BCE)